Parasphyraenops is a small genus of marine ray-finned fishes from the subfamily Serraninae, which is one of three subfamilies in the family Serranidae, which also includes the anthias and groupers. These fishes are found in the central western Atlantic Ocean.

Species
There are two species classified in the genus Parasphyraenops:

 Parasphyraenops atrimanus Bean, 1912 – bank bass, black handed bass
 Parasphyraenops incisus (Colin, 1978) – forktailed bass, bantam bass

References

Serraninae
Perciformes genera